Sirinjeh or Soranjeh or Serenjeh or Sarenjeh or Saranjeh or Sarinjeh may refer to:

Saranjeh, Kerman, a village in Ravar County, Kerman Province, Iran
Sirinjeh, Borujerd, a village in Borujerd County, Lorestan Province, Iran
Soranjeh, Dorud, a village in Dorud County, Lorestan Province, Iran
Soranjeh, Khorramabad, a village in Khorramabad County, Lorestan Province, Iran
Sarenjeh-ye Zivdar, a village in Pol-e Dokhtar County, Lorestan Province, Iran
Soranjeh, Selseleh, a village in Selseleh County, Lorestan Province, Iran
Saranjeh-e Qolayi, a village in Selseleh County, Lorestan Province, Iran